"The New-England Boy's Song about Thanksgiving Day", also known as "Over the River and Through the Woods", is a Thanksgiving poem by Lydia Maria Child, originally published in 1844 in Flowers for Children, Volume 2.

Although many people sing "to grandmother's house we go", the author's original words were "to grandfather's house we go". Moreover, in modern American English, most people use the word woods rather than wood in reference to a forest, and sing the song accordingly.

Background
The poem was originally published as "The New-England Boy's Song about Thanksgiving Day" in Child's Flowers for Children. It celebrates the author's childhood memories of visiting her grandfather's house (said to be the Paul Curtis House). Lydia Maria Child was a novelist, journalist, teacher, and poet who wrote extensively about the need to eliminate slavery.

The poem was eventually set to a tune by an unknown composer. The song version is sometimes presented with lines about Christmas, rather than Thanksgiving. For instance, the line "Hurrah for Thanksgiving Day!" becomes "Hurrah for Christmas Day!" As a Christmas song, it has been recorded as "A Merry Christmas at Grandmother's". Although the modern Thanksgiving holiday is not always associated with snow (snow in late November occasionally occurs in the northern states and is rare at best elsewhere in the United States), New England in the early 19th century was enduring the Little Ice Age, a colder era with earlier winters.

Poem
The original piece had twelve stanzas, though only four are typically included in the song.  One stanza has the word that ends in the M sound rhyme with the word that ends in the N sound.

The following verses appear in a "long version":

Legacy
A children's book, Over the River—A Turkey's Tale, recasts the poem as a humorous tale of a family of turkeys on their way to a vegetarian Thanksgiving; the book was written by Derek Anderson, and published by Simon & Schuster in 2005.

It is also the title of a young adult, historical fiction novel about a teenage pioneer crossing the wilderness with her young siblings in tow. The book, which features young adult heroine Caroline Darley, was written by author Brynna Williamson and was published by Stones in Clay Publishing in 2020.

References

External links
 Over the River and Through the Wood at About.com (updated 	October 5, 2015; archived December 20, 2005 at )

1844 poems
1844 songs
Children's songs
American Christmas songs
Songs based on poems
Thanksgiving songs
Works by Lydia Maria Child
Songs about nature